The Tribelhorn was a Swiss electric car manufactured from 1899 until 1919 in Zurich.  Production began in earnest in 1902; three- and four-wheelers were offered.  The company also produced trolleytrucks that were used in Gümmenen and Mühleberg Switzerland between 1918 and 1922 during the construction of a dam.  It  produced only light utility vans after 1919 when it was taken over by EFAG (Electrische Fahrzeuge AG).

History
The Company A. Tribelhorn & Cie. AG began in 1902 in Feldbach with the production of automobiles and trucks. In 1918 the name was changed to Electrische Fahrzeuge AG and moved to Altstetten. In 1920 the production was stopped.

Vehicles
There were vehicles manufactured exclusively with electric motor. The focus was on the production of commercial vehicles, while passenger cars were only produced in small quantities. 1902 created the first prototype.

Two vehicles of this brand are in the Verkehrshaus der Schweiz to be seen in Luzern.

It is also the name of a conference room at Tesla Motors, Inc.

Books in German language
 Harald H. Linz, Halwart Schrader: Die große Automobil-Enzyklopädie. BLV, München 1986, .
 G.N. Georgano: Autos. Encyclopédie complète. 1885 à nos jours. Courtille, Paris 1975. (französisch)
 Ernest Schmid: Schweizer Autos. Die schweizerischen Automobilkonstruktionen von 1868 bis heute. Auto-Jahr, Lausanne 1978, .
 Martin Sigrist: Johann Albert Tribelhorn und sein Erbe bei EFAG und NEFAG – Pioniergeschichte des elektrischen Automobils. Verein für wirtschaftshistorische Studien, Zürich 2011,  (Schweizer Pioniere der Wirtschaft und Technik. Bd. 93).

References
David Burgess Wise, The New Illustrated Encyclopedia of Automobiles.

Car manufacturers of Switzerland
Electric vehicle manufacturers of Switzerland
Battery electric vehicles
Truck manufacturers of Switzerland